Rómer Roca (born 1 July 1966) is a Bolivian footballer. He played in nine matches for the Bolivia national football team from 1987 to 1989. He was also part of Bolivia's squad for the 1987 Copa América tournament.

References

External links
 

1966 births
Living people
Bolivian footballers
Bolivia international footballers
Association football defenders
Sportspeople from Santa Cruz de la Sierra